Aldridge is an English surname derived from a toponym. Notable people with the surname include:

A. Owen Aldridge (1915–2005), expert in colonial literary studies
Alan Aldridge (1938–2017), English artist
Albert Aldridge (1864–1891), English footballer
Alexandra Aldridge (born 1994), American ice dancer
Allen Aldridge (1944–2015), American football defensive end
Allen Aldridge Jr.  (born 1972), American football linebacker
Amanda Aldridge (1866–1956), English composer
Blake Aldridge (born 1982), British synchronized diver
Brian Aldridge (disambiguation), multiple people, including
Brian Aldridge (umpire) (born 1940), New Zealand cricketer and umpire
Brian Aldridge (politician) (born 1977), American politician in Mississippi
Charles Aldridge (born 1947), New Zealand cricketer
Chris Aldridge, BBC announcer
Cory Aldridge (born 1979), American baseball player
David Aldridge (born 1965), American sports analyst
Edward C. Aldridge Jr. (born 1938), United States Secretary of the Air Force
Eileen Aldridge (1916–1990), English artist
George Aldridge (disambiguation), multiple people, including:
George Aldridge (boxer) (born 1936), British middleweight boxer
George Sydney Aldridge (1847–1911), Australian businessman, president of the Adelaide Stock Exchange
George Washington Aldridge Sr. (1833–1877), New York politician
Gerard Aldridge (born 1958), Canadian politician from Saskatchewan 
Graeme Aldridge (born 1977), New Zealand cricketer
Henry Aldridge (1923–2002), North Carolina politician
Ira Aldridge (1807–1867), American stage actor
James Aldridge (1918–2015), Australian author
James Henry Aldridge (1849–1929) Australian horse breeder and hotelier
Jerry Aldridge (born 1956), American football player
John Aldridge (disambiguation), multiple people, including:
John Aldridge (born 1958), Irish football (soccer) striker
John Aldridge (artist) (1905–1983), English painter and Associate of the Royal Academy
John Aldridge (cricketer) (born 1935), English cricketer
John Aldridge (RAF officer) (1899–1988), World War I flying ace
John W. Aldridge (1922–2007), American writer, literary critic, teacher and scholar
Kay Aldridge (1917–1995), American actress and model
Keith Aldridge (born 1973), American ice hockey defenseman
Kevin Aldridge (born 1980), American football player
Kitty Aldridge, British actress and writer
LaMarcus Aldridge (born 1985), American basketball player
Lily Aldridge (born 1985), American fashion model
Lionel Aldridge (1941–1998), American football player
M. Dayne Aldridge, American engineer
Martin Aldridge (1974–2000), English footballer
Martin Aldridge (politician) (born 1982), Australian politician
Melvin Aldridge (born 1970), American football player
Michael Aldridge (1920–1994), British actor
Michael Aldridge (rugby union) (born 1983), Australian rugby union player
Paul Aldridge (born 1981), English footballer
Peyton Aldridge (born 1995), American basketball player
Rasheen Aldridge Jr. (born 1994), American activist and politician
Richard Aldridge (1945–2014), British palaeontologist
Robert Aldridge (disambiguation), multiple people
Rod Aldridge, British businessman and politician
Ruby Aldridge (born 1991), American model
Sarah Aldridge (1911–2006), Brazil-born lesbian author
Seamus Aldridge (born 1935), Irish Gaelic games administrator and referee
Tommy Aldridge (born 1950), American drummer
Vic Aldridge (1893–1973), American baseball player
Walt Aldridge (born 1955), American musician, singer, songwriter, engineer and record producer
William Aldridge (1737–1797), English nonconformist minister

See also
Aldredge, surname
Alridge, surname

English-language surnames
English toponymic surnames